Ody J. Fish (June 16, 1925 – February 6, 2007) was Chairman of the Republican Party of Wisconsin.

Biography
Fish was born Odilon Fish in Sauk Centre, Minnesota in 1925. He married Mary Ellen Koebke and have two children. In 2007, he died of esophageal cancer at his home in Pewaukee, Wisconsin.

Career
Fish was Chairman of the Republican Party of Wisconsin from 1965 to 1970. Previously, he had chaired and vice chaired the Waukesha County, Wisconsin Republican Party and managed the 1964 gubernatorial campaign of Warren P. Knowles. From 1971 to 1984, Fish was a Republican National Committeeman. He also managed the 1976 Republican National Convention.

References

People from Sauk Centre, Minnesota
People from Pewaukee, Wisconsin
Republican Party of Wisconsin chairs
1925 births
2007 deaths
Deaths from esophageal cancer
Deaths from cancer in Wisconsin